Alina Panova (full name Alina Panova-Marasovich, born Alina Vaksman in Kiev, Ukraine) is a Ukrainian-American film and stage costume designer and producer.

Biography
Panova was born in Kiev, Ukraine, in 1961. She studied art at the Shevchenko State Art School in Kiev, and Cooper Union in New York City, after her family emigrated to the US in 1979.

Career
In 2006 Panova produced her first feature film, ORANGELOVE (directed by Alan Badoyev and starring Aleksei Chadov and Olga Makeyeva). The film premiered at the Cannes Film Festival.

Family
Panova is married to Croatian composer Zeljko Marasovich. She lives in Los Angeles, California.

Filmography
 The Age of Innocence (1993)
 Addams Family Values (1993)
 Notes From Underground (1995)
 Dunston Checks In (1996)
 The Naked Man (1998)
 Bruiser (2000)
 Sexual Life (2005)
 Standing Still (2005)
 Orangelove (2007)

References

External links
Alina Panova Official Web Site
Orange Love- The Movie

Ukrainian women artists
Ukrainian Jews
Film people from Kyiv
1961 births
American film producers
American costume designers
Living people
Cooper Union alumni
Shevchenko State Art School alumni